Bowen may refer to:

Places

Australia
 Bowen, Queensland, a town
 Bowen Hills, Queensland, a suburb
 Bowen Hills railway station, a railway station in Bowen Hills
 Bowen Park, Brisbane, a park in Bowen Hills
 Bowen Bridge, crossing the Derwent River in Tasmania

United States
 Bowen, Colorado (Las Animas County)
 Bowen, Colorado (Rio Grande County)
 Bowen, Illinois
 Bowen, Missouri
 Bowen, Nebraska
 Bowen, West Virginia

Other places
 Bowen, Mendoza, a district in the General Alvear Department, Argentina
 Bowen Island, British Columbia, Canada
 Bowen Road, Hong Kong
 Bowen's Court, County Cork, Ireland
 Bowen University, Iwo, Nigeria
 Bowen Secondary School, a secondary school in Hougang, Singapore

Lakes
 Bowen Lake, a lake in Alberta, Canada
 Lake Bowen, a lake in South Carolina, U.S.

Other
 Bowen (crater), a lunar crater
 Bowen (surname)
 Bowen knot, an emblem
 Bowen ratio, used to describe energy flux
 Bowen technique, an alternative massage therapy
 Bowen Theory, developed by Murray Bowen, M.D.
 Bowen's Disease, a sunlight-induced skin disease
 Bowen's Kale, a calibration substance
 Bowen's reaction series, in geology
 Bowens International, a manufacturer of professional photographic lighting equipment
 HMAS Bowen, an Australian warship named after Bowen, Queensland
 Mount Bowen, in Victoria Land, Antarctica
 Mount Bowen (Queensland), in Queensland, Australia
 Plant Bowen, a major coal-fired power plant in Georgia, U.S.
 Bowen script (僰文) traditionally used for writing the Bai language

People with the family name
 Anthony Bowens (born 1990), American professional wrestler
 George Bowen (1821–1899), British viceregal
 Jarrod Bowen (born 1996), English footballer
 John Bowen (pirate) (16??–1704), pirate of Créole origin active during the Golden Age of Piracy
 Natasha Bowen, Nigerian Welsh writer
 York Bowen (1884-1961), composer

People with the given name
 Bowen Ebenezer Aylsworth (1835–1914), Ontario political figure
 Bowen Byram (born 2001), Canadian ice hockey player
 Bowen Huang (born 1987), Chinese footballer
 Bowen Leung (born 1949), former Hong Kong civil servant
 Bowen Lockwood (born 1978), former Australian rules footballer
 Bowen Ouyang (born 1992), Chinese male tennis player
 Bowen Southwell (1713–1796), Irish politician
 Bowen Stassforth (1926–2019), American former competition swimmer
 Bowen Yang (born 1990), American comedian, SNL cast member

See also
 Bowen, Colorado (disambiguation)
 Bowen Park (disambiguation)
 Bowen River (disambiguation)
 Justice Bowen (disambiguation)
 
 Bowenite, a mineral
 Bowenia, a genus of cycads in the family Stangeriaceae